Penguin Popular Classics, issued in 1994, are paperback editions of texts under the Classics imprints. They were created as a response to Wordsworth Classics, a series of very cheap reprints which imitated Penguin in using black as its signature colour. The series started with editions with individual painted motives by various painters, but switched to a uniform bright green colour in 2007. Penguin Books dropped Popular Classics in 2013.

Books

Printed with individual covers

Printed with uniform bright green colour

References 

Penguin Books book series